Gitesi is a sector in Karongi district, Western Province, Rwanda.  The population in 2012 was 24,859. Gitesi contains many plantations of coffee and tea also contain Gasenyi (Rwanda)
in Rwariro cell where Karongi tea factory located.

References

External links 

 https://www.beautyofrwanda.com/destinations-2/karongi/gitesi-sector/
 https://sobanukirwa.rw/body/gitesi_sector
 https://eastafricatenders.com/tenders-in-rwanda/western/karongi/gitesi/

Geography of Rwanda
Western Province, Rwanda
Sectors of Rwanda